Kuri Rural District is in the Central District of Jam County, Bushehr province, Iran. At the census of 2006, its population was 3,309 in 711 households; there were 3,689 inhabitants in 951 households at the following census of 2011; and in the most recent census of 2016, the population of the rural district was 4,512 in 1,203 households. The largest of its 16 villages was Kuri Hayati, with 1,136 people.

References 

Rural Districts of Bushehr Province
Populated places in Jam County